The 2013–14 Atlantic 10 Conference men's basketball season was the 38th season of Atlantic 10 Conference basketball. The season marked the first for new member, George Mason, following the sudden departure of Butler and Xavier.  The 2014 Atlantic 10 men's basketball tournament was held at Barclays Center in Brooklyn, New York.

The defending regular season and tournament champions were Saint Louis.

References